Lactuca tetrantha, the Troödos lettuce, is an erect, lactiferous, perennial herb, 10–30 cm high. Leaves hairless, deeply dissected, the basal in rosette, oblong, 3-12 x 0.8-2.5 cm, often purplish-green, the upper alternate, smaller. Flowers in capitula, arranged in corymbs, florets 4, ligulate, yellow, reddish at the lower surface, flowers July–October, fruit a pappose achene.

Habitat
Rocky hillsides and rock crevices on serpentinised rocks at 1500–1900 m altitude.

Distribution
Endemic to Cyprus where it is restricted to the higher parts of the Troödos Forest, mostly around Khionistra where it is not uncommon.

References

 Cyprus Flora in Colour the Endemics, V. Pantelas, T. Papachristophorou, P. Christodoulou, July 1993,

External links

tetrantha
Endemic flora of Cyprus